Micraglossa straminealis is a moth in the family Crambidae. It was described by George Hampson in 1903. It is found in India, Nepal and Sichuan, China.

The length of the forewings is about 6 mm for males and 7 mm for females. The ground colour of the forewings is pale golden with grey pattern elements. The basal area is suffused grey and the antemedian line is grey. The postmedian line runs from the costa towards the dorsum and has a grey spot distally at the costa. The subterminal line forms an X shape together with the postmedian line.

References

Moths described in 1903
Scopariinae